Alcee Lamar Hastings (September 5, 1936 – April 6, 2021) was an American politician and judge from the state of Florida.

Hastings was nominated to the United States District Court for the Southern District of Florida by President Jimmy Carter in August 1979. He was confirmed by the United States Senate on October 31, 1979. In 1981, after an FBI sting operation, Hastings was charged with conspiracy to solicit a bribe. Following a 1983 criminal trial, Hastings was acquitted; however, he was impeached for bribery and perjury by the United States House of Representatives in 1988 and was convicted by the United States Senate in his impeachment trial on October 20, 1989. While Hastings was removed from the bench, the Senate did not bar him from holding public office in the future.  Hastings was the first and only African American impeached.

A Democrat, Hastings was first elected to the United States House of Representatives in 1992. He represented Florida's 23rd congressional district from 1993 to 2013 and represented Florida's 20th congressional district from 2013 until his death in 2021. The 20th district included most of the majority-black precincts in and around Fort Lauderdale and West Palm Beach. Following Senator Bill Nelson's departure from office in January 2019, Hastings became the dean of Florida's congressional delegation; he retained this title until his death.

Early life, education, and early career
Alcee Lamar Hastings was born in Altamonte Springs, Florida, the son of Mildred L. (Merritt) and Julius "J. C." Hastings. He was educated at Crooms Academy in Goldsboro (Sanford), Florida, before going on to attend Howard University in Washington, D.C. and Fisk University in Nashville, Tennessee. He earned his Bachelor of Arts degree in zoology and botany from Fisk in 1958. After being dismissed from Howard University School of Law, Hastings received his Juris Doctor from Florida A&M University College of Law in 1963. While in school, he became a member of the Kappa Alpha Psi fraternity. He was admitted to the bar in 1963, and began to practice law.

1970 U.S. Senate election

Hastings decided to run for the United States Senate in 1970 after incumbent Spessard Holland decided to retire. He failed to win the Democratic primary or make the runoff election, finishing fourth out of five candidates, with 13% of the vote. Former Governor Farris Bryant finished first with 33% of the vote. State Senator Lawton Chiles was second with 26%. Chiles defeated Bryant in the runoff election and won the November general election.

Judicial career (1977–1989)

In 1977, Hastings became a judge of the circuit court of Broward County, Florida. On August 28, 1979, President Jimmy Carter nominated Hastings to the United States District Court for the Southern District of Florida. He was confirmed by the United States Senate on October 31, 1979, and received his commission on November 2, 1979. Hastings was the first black federal judge in the history of the state of Florida. His service was terminated on October 20, 1989, due to impeachment and conviction.

Allegations and impeachment

Criminal trial
In 1981, after a sting operation by the FBI against attorney and alleged co-conspirator William Borders, Hastings was charged with conspiracy to solicit a $150,000 bribe in exchange for a lenient sentence for Frank and Thomas Romano on 21 counts of racketeering and the return of their seized assets. In his 1983 trial, Hastings was acquitted by a jury after Borders refused to testify in court, despite having been convicted in his own trial in 1982. Borders went to jail for accepting the first $25,000 payment, but was later given a full pardon by President Bill Clinton on his last day in office.

Impeachment trial
The Judicial Conference of the United States investigated Hasting and brought its accusations, which it believed warranted an impeachment, to the United States House of Representatives.

In 1988, the Democratic-controlled House of Representatives took up the case, and Hastings was impeached for bribery and perjury by a vote of 413–3. He was then convicted in his impeachment trial before the United States Senate on October 20, 1989. At the time, the Senate was also controlled by a Democratic majority. Hastings became the sixth federal judge in the history of the United States to be removed from office by the Senate. The Senate, in two hours of roll calls, voted on 11 of the 17 articles of impeachment. It convicted Hastings of eight of the 11 articles. The vote on the first article was 69 for and 26 opposed. He was removed from the bench, but the Senate did not preclude him from holding office in the future.

Appeal
Hastings filed suit in federal court claiming that his impeachment trial was invalid because he was tried by a Senate committee, not in front of the full Senate, and that he had been acquitted in a criminal trial. Judge Stanley Sporkin ruled in favor of Hastings, remanding the case to the Senate, but stayed his ruling pending the outcome of an appeal to the Supreme Court in a similar case regarding Judge Walter Nixon, who had also been impeached and removed.

The Supreme Court ruled in Nixon v. United States, again referring to Walter Nixon, that procedures for trying an impeached individual cannot be subject to review by the judiciary. Judge Sporkin changed his ruling accordingly, and Hastings's conviction and removal were upheld.

1990 Secretary of State election
Hastings attempted to make a political comeback by running for Secretary of State of Florida, campaigning on a platform of legalizing casinos. In a three-way Democratic primary, he placed second with 33% of the vote, behind newspaper columnist Jim Minter's 38% of the vote. In the runoff, which saw a large dropoff in turnout, Minter defeated Hastings, 67%–33%. Hastings won just one of Florida's 67 counties: Miami-Dade.

U.S. House of Representatives (1993–2021)

Elections
Hastings was elected to the United States House of Representatives in 1992, representing Florida's 23rd district. After placing second in the initial Democratic primary for the post, he scored an upset victory over state representative Lois J. Frankel in the runoff, and went on to easily win election in the heavily Democratic district. He did not face a serious challenge for reelection thereafter. Following redistricting, Hastings represented Florida's 20th district from January 2013 until his death. His death triggered a special election in 2022.

Tenure
Hastings was a member of the Congressional Black Caucus and was elected president of the Parliamentary Assembly of the Organization for Security and Co-operation in Europe in July 2004. As a senior Democratic whip, Hastings was an influential member of the Democratic leadership. He was also a member of the House Rules Committee. He was previously a senior member of the House Permanent Select Committee on Intelligence (HPSCI). On the HPSCI, Hastings was the chairman of the Subcommittee on Oversight and Investigations.

Hastings voted to impeach Texas federal judge Samuel B. Kent on all four counts presented against him on June 19, 2009.

On December 18, 2019, Hastings voted to impeach President Donald Trump. On January 13, 2021, he voted to impeach Trump for a second time.

Objection to the 2000 presidential election
Hastings and other members of the House of Representatives objected to counting the 25 electoral votes from Florida which George W. Bush narrowly won after a contentious recount. Because no senator joined his objection, the objection was dismissed by Vice President Al Gore, who was Bush's opponent in the 2000 presidential election.

Objection to the 2004 presidential election
Hastings was one of the 31 House Democrats who voted not to count the 20 electoral votes from Ohio in the 2004 presidential election, despite Republican President George W. Bush winning the state by 118,457 votes. Without Ohio's electoral votes, the election would have been decided by the U.S. House of Representatives, with each state having one vote in accordance with the Twelfth Amendment to the United States Constitution.

Bid for chairmanship of the House Intelligence Committee
After the 2006 United States House of Representatives elections, Hastings attracted attention after it was reported that incoming House Speaker Nancy Pelosi might appoint him as head of the House Permanent Select Committee on Intelligence. He had support from the Congressional Black Caucus but was opposed by the Blue Dog Coalition. Hastings attacked his critics as “misinformed fools.” Pelosi reportedly favored Hastings over the ranking Democrat, Jane Harman, due to policy differences and the Congressional Black Caucus's support. On November 28, 2006, Pelosi announced that Hastings would not be the committee's chairman, and she later chose Silvestre Reyes (D-TX). While Hastings was passed over to chair the committee, he became chair of a subcommittee. He told the National Journal, “I am not angry. At some point along the way, it became too much to explain. That is legitimate politics. But it’s unfortunate for me.”

Comments about Sarah Palin
On September 24, 2008, Hastings came under fire for comments he made about Republican vice-presidential candidate Sarah Palin. Speaking in Washington, D.C., to a conference sponsored by the National Jewish Democratic Council, he said, "If Sarah Palin isn't enough of a reason for you to get over whatever your problem is with Barack Obama, then you damn well had better pay attention. Anybody toting guns and stripping moose don't care too much about what they do with Jews and blacks. So, you just think this through."

On September 29, 2008, Hastings issued a written apology, while standing by its core message: "I regret the comments I made last Tuesday that were not smart and certainly not relevant to hunters or sportsmen. The point I made, and will continue to make, is that the policies and priorities of a McCain-Palin administration would be anathema to most African Americans and Jews. I regret that I was not clearer and apologize to Governor Palin, my host where I was speaking, and those who my comments may have offended."

Lexus lease
In May 2009, The Wall Street Journal reported that Hastings spent over $24,000 in taxpayer money in 2008 to lease a luxury Lexus hybrid sedan. The Journal noted that the expenditure was legal, properly accounted for, and drawn from an expense allowance the U.S. government grants to all lawmakers.

Sexual harassment allegation
In June 2011, one of Hastings's staff members, Winsome Packer, filed a lawsuit alleging that he had made repeated unwanted sexual advances and threatened her job when she refused him. A congressional ethics panel investigated these claims. Packer was represented by the conservative legal group Judicial Watch. Hastings denied the allegations and called them "ludicrous." He said, "I will win this lawsuit. That is a certainty. In a race with a lie, the truth always wins. And when the truth comes to light and the personal agendas of my accusers are exposed, I will be vindicated.” In February 2012, it was reported that Hastings would be released from the lawsuit, and it would only continue against the Helsinki Commission which Hastings chaired and Packer represented in Vienna. In December 2017, it was reported that the Treasury Department paid $220,000 to settle the lawsuit. Hastings later complained that he played no role in the settlement negotiations but the way they had been framed implied that he had.

Committee assignments 
 Committee on Rules (Vice Chair)
 Subcommittee on Legislative and Budget Process
 Helsinki Commission (Chair)

Leadership positions 
 Florida Congressional delegation (co-chairman)
 Senior Democratic whip
 Congressional Caucus on Global Road Safety (co-chairman)
 International Conservation Caucus
 Sportsmen's Caucus

Caucus memberships 
 Congressional Arts Caucus
 Afterschool Caucuses
 Congressional NextGen 9-1-1 Caucus
 United States Congressional International Conservation Caucus
Veterinary Medicine Caucus
U.S.-Japan Caucus
Medicare for All Caucus
Blue Collar Caucus

Political positions

Foreign policy
Hastings opposed President Donald Trump's decision to recognize Jerusalem as Israel's capital. He stated: "I believe that Jerusalem is and should remain the undivided capital of Israel. To deny the Jewish connection to Jerusalem would be to deny world history. That being said, the manner in which the Trump Administration has announced its recognition of Jerusalem as the capital of Israel is of great concern."

Gun policy
Hastings said that gun control is a "critical element" in addressing the United States' crime problem. He favored reinstating the Federal Assault Weapons Ban and supported a federal ban on bump stocks. He supported raising the minimum age to buy a rifle from 18 to 21. In 2017, he voted against the Concealed Carry Reciprocity Act of 2017. His last rating from the NRA was an F, indicating that the organization believed that he did not support gun rights legislation.

Following the 2018 Stoneman Douglas High School shooting, Hastings released a statement in which he said, "The stranglehold of the gun lobby has gone on long enough."
Hastings wrote a letter to the Speaker of the Florida House and President of the Florida Senate urging them to repeal the state's preemption law, which prohibits communities in Florida from passing their own gun regulations.

Personal life and death
Hastings was married three times and had three children; his first two marriages ended in divorce. He married Patricia Williams in 2019, and they remained together until his death.

In January 2019, Hastings was diagnosed with pancreatic cancer, and he died from the disease on April 6, 2021, at the age of 84.

See also
 List of African-American federal judges
 List of African-American jurists
 List of African-American United States representatives
 List of United States Congress members who died in office (2000–)

References

Sources
Books

External links

 U.S. House website (archived)
 
 
Obituary in Washington Post, April 2021

 
 In Black America; The Honorable Alcee Lamar Hastings, 1986-09-30, KUT Radio, American Archive of Public Broadcasting
 Alcee Hastings Collection, African American Research Library and Cultural Center, Broward County Library

|-

|-

|-

|-

|-

1936 births
2021 deaths
20th-century American judges
20th-century American lawyers
20th-century American politicians
21st-century African-American people
21st-century American politicians
African-American Methodists
African-American judges
African-American members of the United States House of Representatives
African-American people in Florida politics
Deaths from pancreatic cancer
Democratic Party members of the United States House of Representatives from Florida
Fisk University alumni
Florida state court judges
Howard University alumni
Impeached United States federal judges removed from office
Judges of the United States District Court for the Southern District of Florida
People from Altamonte Springs, Florida
People from Miramar, Florida
United States district court judges appointed by Jimmy Carter